Diminuendo, Crescendo and Blues is an album recorded in 1958 by the C Jam All-Stars led by Paul Gonsalves.

Recording and music
The album was recorded in Munich on November 15, 1958, during a Duke Ellington orchestra tour of Europe. The musicians are tenor saxophonist Paul Gonsalves, trumpeter Clark Terry, local pianist Carlos Diernhammer, bassist Jimmy Woode, and drummer Sam Woodyard. The material "is a mix of Ellington tunes, a couple of standards, and five songs written by Terry or Gonsalves".

Release and reception
Diminuendo, Crescendo and Blues was released in Germany by Bertelsmann Record Club. It was reissued on CD in the US by RCA Victor in 1999. The AllMusic reviewer commented on the brief running time of the CD version, but concluded that the album was "highly recommended".

Track listing
"Diminuendo and Crescendo in Blue"
"I Cover the Waterfront"
"C Jam Blues"
"Evad"
"It Don't Mean a Thing (If It Ain't Got That Swing)"
"Autobahn"
"Willow Weep for Me"
"Hildegard"
"Ocean Motion"
"Jivin' With Fritz"

Personnel 
Paul Gonsalves – tenor saxophone
Clark Terry – trumpet
Carlos Diernhammer – piano
Jimmy Woode – bass
Sam Woodyard – drums

References

1958 albums
Paul Gonsalves albums
RCA Records albums